Toni Jaeger-Fine (born 1961) is an American lawyer, author, speaker, and law school administrator.

Jaeger-Fine is the author of the book Becoming a Lawyer: Discovering and Defining Your Professional Persona, published in 2018 by West. She lectured nationally and worldwide about elements that define the profile of a truly professional and flourishing lawyer.

She also published books and speaks widely on the US legal system including American Legal Systems: A Resource and Reference Guide and The U.S. Legal System: Cases and Materials. Together with Desiree Jaeger-Fine she published the book Mastering the U.S. LL.M.: From Whether to When, What, Where, and How. Thomson published her book An Introduction to the Anglo-American Legal System, which has been translated into Italian, Korean, and Portuguese. She authored legal articles on marriage equality and higher education management.

Jaeger-Fine is the assistant dean of international and non-J.D. programs at Fordham University School of Law in New York City. Previously, she was the associate director of the Global Law program at New York University School of Law and Cardozo Law School, and was an associate at Crowell & Moring Toni Jaeger-Fine blogs at YourProfessionalPersona.com.

Jaeger-Fine is a recognized expert on international legal education programs and globalization of legal profession. In 2022, she received the Dean’s Medal of Recognition, "the highest award the Dean can confer upon a member of the Fordham Law community."

As a consultant and author about diversity in legal profession, in 2022 she claimed that "law is the profession most lacking in diversity in the United States."

References 

Living people
American legal scholars
1961 births